TFVC may refer to :

 Texans for Vaccine Choice, a political action committee in the U.S state of Texas.
 Team Foundation Version Control, a version control system of Azure DevOps, formerly known as Team Foundation Server and Visual Studio Team System